Varakļāni Municipality is a municipality in Latgale, Latvia. The municipality was formed in 2009 by merging Varakļāni town, Murmastiene parish and Varakļāni parish; the administrative centre being Varakļāni.

Parts of Teiči Nature Reserve are located in Varakļāni Municipality. The population in 2020 was 2,990.

Within the 2021 Latvian administrative reform it was initially planned to merge Varakļāni Municipality into Rēzekne Municipality. After protests from locals, parts of which wanted to preserve the status quo or preferred joining Madona Municipality, the municipal council submitted a case to the Constitutional Court of Latvia in June 2020. On 28 May 2021 the court declared the planned merge is unconstitutional. However, on June 31 the Saeima voted to proceed with the merge, which prompted the involvement of the President of Latvia Egils Levits to avoid triggering a constitutional crisis. Ultimately, a decision was made to postpone the decision on the future of the Varakļāni and Rēzekne municipalities until 2025. Due to this, the 2021 Latvian local elections for the new municipalities were also held in Varakļāni.

See also 
 Administrative divisions of Latvia (2009)

References 

 
Municipalities of Latvia